Dahongmen Subdistrict is a subdistrict on the east side of Fengtai District, Beijing, China. It borders Xiluoyuan Subdistrict to the north, Xiaohongmen Township to the east, Nanyuan Township to the south, Majiabao Subdistrict to the west, and contains exclaves of Nanyuan Townshio within. The result of the 2020 Census determined the population to be at 177,946.

This subdistrict's name referred to a former gate of Imperial Garden that once existed in this region during the Ming and Qing dynasty.

History

Administrative Division 
In 2021, Dahongmen has direct jurisdiction over 22 subdivisions, of which 19 are communities and 3 are villages:

See also 

 List of township-level divisions of Beijing

References 

Fengtai District
Subdistricts of Beijing